The Nore is a sandbank in the Thames Estuary, England.

Nore may also refer to:
Geographical features 
 River Nore, Ireland
 Pic de Nore, a mountain in the south of France

Military 
 Commander-in-Chief, The Nore, a former major operational command of Britain's Royal Navy
 Nore Mutiny by Royal Navy sailors in 1797

People 
 Nore Davis (born 1984), American comedian 
 Arne Nore (born 1946), Norwegian businessman
 N.O.R.E. (born 1977), a rapper

Settlements 
 Nore Township, Minnesota, USA
 Nore, Norway, a village in Buskerud, Norway
 Nursu, Azerbaijan, formerly called Nore
 Nore, Sweden, a village in Gävleborg

Other meanings 
 N.O.R.E. (album), a 1998 album by Noreaga
 N.O.R.E. (song) by Noreaga